Nick Zakelj (born June 22, 1999) is an American football offensive tackle for the San Francisco 49ers of the National Football League (NFL). He played college football at Fordham.

College career
Zakelj was a member of the Fordham Rams for five seasons. He became a starter at tackle during his freshman season. Zakelj was named first-team All-Patriot League in each of his final three seasons.

Professional career

Zakelj was selected in the sixth round of the 2022 NFL Draft by the San Francisco 49ers.

Personal life
He has a bachelor's degree in finance and a master's degree in business analytics from Fordham.

References

External links
 San Francisco 49ers bio
Fordham Rams bio

Living people
People from Broadview Heights, Ohio
Players of American football from Ohio
American football offensive tackles
Fordham Rams football players
San Francisco 49ers players
Sportspeople from Cuyahoga County, Ohio
1999 births